The Trumpchi Empow (影豹) is a compact sedan produced by GAC Group under the Trumpchi brand in China and the GAC Motor brand globally. It was intended to be a sports sedan to differentiate from the GA4 compact sedan.

Overview

The Trumpchi Empow was first previewed in 2020 at the 2020 Guangzhou Auto Show in semi-concept form as the EMPOW55 Concept. The production Trumpchi Empow was officially launched during the 2021 Shanghai Auto Show in Shanghai as the successor of the Trumpchi GA4 compact sedan in China, despite the GA4 continuing to be sold alongside and also received a facelift in early 2021. The production Empow sedan is based on GAC's new Global Platform Modular Architecture. Prices for Trumpchi Empow in China ranges from 98,800 to 128,800 yuan at launch (12,880 to 16,790 euros).

Powertrain
The Empow sedan is powered by a 1.5-liter turbo I4 with 177 hp and 270 Nm of torque mated to a 7-speed dual clutch transmission. The Empow is front-wheel drive only and acceleration from 0 to 100 km/h takes 7 seconds. a 2.0 litre turbocharged engine version mated to an 8-speed automatic gearbox and a hybrid version was available later.

See also
 List of GAC vehicles

References

External links

 

Empow
Cars introduced in 2021
Compact cars
Cars of China
Front-wheel-drive vehicles